Jayshreeben Patel (born 22 June 1959) was twice a member of Lok Sabha representing Mahesana (Lok Sabha constituency) of Gujarat. She was elected to Lok Sabha in 2009 and 2014  as a candidate of Bharatiya Janata Party.

References

India MPs 2009–2014
People from Mehsana district
Women in Gujarat politics
1959 births
Living people
Gujarati people
Lok Sabha members from Gujarat
India MPs 2014–2019
21st-century Indian women politicians
21st-century Indian politicians
Bharatiya Janata Party politicians from Gujarat